Hershkovitz's titi monkey (Plecturocebus dubius) is a species of titi monkey, a type of New World monkey, from South America. It is found in Bolivia, Brazil, and Peru. The common name is in reference to American zoologist Philip Hershkovitz, who described the species as Callicebus dubius in 1988.

References

Hershkovitz's titi
Mammals of Brazil
Mammals of Peru
Mammals of Bolivia
Hershkovitz's titi
Taxa named by Philip Hershkovitz